The National Bank of China was a bank in Hong Kong. It was founded in 1891 by a wealthy and influential Guangzhou family. It is the first banknote issuer to be financed by Chinese merchants, and issued banknotes in denominations of HK$5 and HK$10. The bank closed in 1911.

References 

Banks disestablished in 1911
Defunct banks of Hong Kong
Former banknote issuers of Hong Kong
Banks established in 1891
1891 establishments in Hong Kong
1911 disestablishments in Hong Kong